The Cambridge Companions to Philosophy, Religion and Culture form a book series published by Cambridge University Press. Each book is a collection of essays on the topic commissioned by the publisher.

Volumes (sortable table)

Cambridge University Press books
Series of books
Lists of books
Lists of books about religion